Drivin' Hard, released in May 1981 on the Polydor label, is the first album by English jazz-funk band Shakatak.

Track listing
All tracks written by William "Bill" Sharpe except where indicated.

"Livin in the U.K." (Stayton Heyward; Neil Heyward; Bill Sharpe; Wally Badarou) – 5:54
"Into the Night" – 4:36
"Toot the Shoot" (Roger Odell) – 4:00 
"Lumiere" 4:14
"Late Night Flight" – 3:58
"Waves" – 1:38
"Steppin' (Live)" – 6:27
"Covina" – 4:46
"You Never Know" – 5:10
"Brazilian Dawn" – 6:33

Personnel
 Bill Sharpe – Bösendorfer grand piano, keyboards 
 Nigel Wright – Fender Rhodes electric piano, Sennheiser Vocoder, Oberheim OB-X synthesizer, keyboards and synthesizers
 Wally Badarou – Prophet 5 and inspiration
 Keith Winter – Yamaha & Fender guitars with Fender amplification, Ovation acoustic guitars
 Steve Underwood – Fender bass with Fender amplification
 Roger Odell – Sonor drums, Rototoms, synthdrums, Zildjian cymbals
 Jill Saward – vocals
 Jackie Rawe – vocals

Formats
LP: Polydor  POLS 1030  [47'08]  (May 1981, red label)
LP: Polydor 2383 635 (1981, Netherlands), extra track A1 "Easier Said Than Done"
MC: Polydor  POLSC 1030  [47'08] (May 1981)
CD: Polydor  823 017-2  [47'11]  (1984, track 7 is in fact the studio version of "Steppin'" [5'50])
CD: Victor VICP 64131 (2008, Japan), bonus tracks "Feels Like the Right Time" and "Killing Time"

References

External links 
 Shakatak - Drivin' Hard (1981) album credits & releases at AllMusic
 Shakatak - Drivin' Hard (1981) album releases & credits at Discogs
 Shakatak - Drivin' Hard (1981) album to be listened as stream on Spotify

1981 debut albums
Shakatak albums
Polydor Records albums